Tian Ye may refer to:

 Tian Ye (mathematician) (born  1971), Chinese mathematician
 Tian Ye (footballer) (born 1972), Chinese footballer
 Tian Ye (skier) (born 1982), Chinese cross-country skier and biathlete